The 1989 Purim stabbing attack was the random stabbing of Israeli civilians in Tel Aviv, Israel on the Jewish holiday of Purim on 21 March 1989. The attacker was an Arab construction worker. Two Israelis were murdered and one severely injured in the attack.

Attack
Muhammad Zakut stabbed three Israeli with a commando knife as he shouted "Allahu Akbar" (God is great). One of the victims, Kurt Moshe Schallinger, 73, was killed as he left his car on a Tel Aviv street full of children in costume, celebrating the holiday of Purim. Zakut said his goal was to "stab in the neck the first Israeli his eyes fell on."  He murdered two Israelis and severely injured a third in the back of his head and his spinal cord before being caught. One of the victims was an elderly scientist on his way home from delivering mishloah manot. The other was the head of the Environment Association in Tel Aviv.

Perpetrator
Zakut received a life sentence, but on 18 October 2011, he was released to Gaza as part of the Gilad Shalit prisoner exchange between Israel and Hamas.

See also
Palestinian political violence
Stabbing as a terrorist tactic

References

1989 Purim stabbing attack
Terrorist incidents in Israel in the 1980s
Terrorist incidents in Asia in 1989
Terrorist attacks attributed to Palestinian militant groups
Deaths by stabbing in Israel
Terrorist incidents involving knife attacks
1989 murders in Israel
1980s in Tel Aviv